I'm Him (His Imperial Majesty) is the second studio album by American rapper Kevin Gates. It was released on September 27, 2019, via Atlantic Records and Bread Winners' Association.

Background
On January 10, 2018, Gates was released from prison. His return to social media saw him posting a picture with the phrase "I'm Him", many fans speculating it to be the title of his second album. On June 28, 2019, Gates announced the album along with the release of the album's lead single "Push It", with "I'm Him" as the official album title. On September 17, Gates announced the release date on social media. I'm Him served as his second studio album, following his debut album in early 2016. The album follows four months after May 2019's Only the Generals Gon Understand EP.

Singles
The lead single "Push It" was released on June 28, 2019. The music video was released the same day.

The second single, "Facts", was released on July 25, 2019. The music video was released on the same day.

Commercial performance
I'm Him debuted at number four on the US Billboard 200 chart, earning 72,000 album-equivalent units (of which 10,000 were pure album sales) in its first week. This became Gates' fourth US top 10 album. On June 10, 2020, the album was certified gold by the Recording Industry Association of America (RIAA) for combined sales and album-equivalent units of over 500,000 units in the United States.

Track listing
Adapted from Apple Music and Tidal.

Notes 

  signifies an uncredited co-producer
  signifies an additional producer

Charts

Weekly charts

Year-end charts

Certifications

References

2019 albums
Kevin Gates albums
Albums produced by Take a Daytrip
Albums produced by Nard & B